Recklinghausen Hauptbahnhof is a railway station for the city of Recklinghausen in Germany.

History
The original station opened in 1870 by the Cologne-Minden Railway Company as part of the construction of the Hamburg-Venlo railway.

During the Second World War, on 1 April 1945, a heavy bombing raid mostly destroyed the station and tracks. It is commemorated by the bunker built next to the station, in which the Kunsthalle Recklinghausen was established in 1950.

An outstanding feature of the architecture of the station building with its glass front is now the clock tower. The new bus station was built in 1998. Up until the renovation of the building, a plaque commemorating the 5000th kilometer of electrified rail of the Deutsche Bundesbahn, was located in the station. The plaque has been missing since the completion of the renovation.

References

Railway stations in North Rhine-Westphalia
Hauptbahnhof
S2 (Rhine-Ruhr S-Bahn)
Rhine-Ruhr S-Bahn stations
Buildings and structures in Recklinghausen (district)
Railway stations in Germany opened in 1870